Guccio Giovanbattista Giacinto Dario Maria Gucci (26 March 1881 – 2 January 1953) was an Italian businessman and fashion designer. He is known for being the founder of the fashion house Gucci.

Early life 
Guccio Gucci was born in Florence, Tuscany on 26 March 1881. He was the son of Tuscan parents, Gabriello Gucci, a leather craftsman from San Miniato, and Elena Santini, from Lastra a Signa.

As a teenager, in 1899, Guccio Gucci worked at the Savoy Hotel in London. Little is known about his early life circumstances and what influenced his move to London. Gucci was inspired by the elegant upper-class hotel guests and by luggage companies such as H.J. Cave & Sons. He returned to Florence and started making luxury luggage and accessories.

Career 
In 1921, he founded the House of Gucci in Florence as a small family-owned leather shop. He began selling saddles, leather bags and other accessories to horsemen in the 1920s. In 1938, Gucci expanded his business to a second location in Rome at the insistence of his son Aldo. His one-man business eventually turned into a family business when his sons joined the company.

In 1951, Gucci opened their store in Milan. He wanted to keep the business small, and for nearly the entirety of his life, the company remained only in Italy. Two weeks before Guccio Gucci's death, the New York Gucci boutique was opened by his sons Aldo, Rodolfo, and Vasco.

Death and legacy 
He died on 2 January 1953 in Milan. After his death, the business was left to his five sons. With the change in leadership the Gucci brand expanded to opening international locations and a diversification of product line.

The Gucci Museum (also called Gucci Garden) in Florence, is a fashion museum centered around the history of the company and Guccio Gucci.

Personal life 
Gucci and his wife, Aida Calvelli, married in 1901 and had six children, five sons and one daughter. His son Ugo Calvelli Gucci (1899–1973) was adopted, born from his mother Aida Calvelli's previous relationship. His son Enzo (1904–1913) died in childhood. His sons Ugo, Aldo, Vasco, and Rodolfo Gucci held prominent roles in his company, but his daughter was not given a role. There was a lot of sibling rivalry to hold power within the company, and by the 1980s, this became a serious issue dividing the family.

In his final years, he lived near Rusper, in West Sussex, England.

Arms

Guccio Gucci; his eldest biological son, Aldo Gucci; Aldo Gucci's sons, Giorgio Gucci, Paolo Gucci, and Roberto Gucci; and grandson Uberto Gucci claimed the right to use an inherited, ancestral coat of arms after the Kingdom of Italy, which was ruled by the House of Savoy, transitioned to the Italian Republic in 1946.

Guccio Gucci adapted, or incorporated, the Gucci coat-of-arms, as recorded in the Archives of Florence, into the Gucci company's knight logo, which was trademarked by the Gucci company on February 4, 1955.

The blazon recorded in the Florence Archives is as follows: "Azure, three red poles bordered argent (white); a chief or, loaded to the right (dexter) of a wheel of azure, and to the left (sinister) of a rose of red." ("D'azzurro, a tre pali di rosso bordati d'argento; e al capo d'oro caricato a destra di una ruota d'azzurro, e a sinistra di una rosa di rosso.")

Translation: "Family of San Miniato; Giacinto Gucci and his brothers were admitted to the nobility of San Miniato in 1763 (on that occasion it is declared that the family had come from Cremona in 1224); Giuseppe di Gaetano Gucci, on the other hand, was admitted to the nobility of Fiesole in 1839. Francesco di Benedetto Gucci obtained Florentine citizenship in 1601, for the Golden Lion banner; Giovanni Battista by Giovan Piero Gucci obtained it in 1634, in the Scala banner."

Court documents, records, and subsequent rulings indicate that, because the Gucci family trademarked the coat-of-arms in 1955, the trademark transferred with the sale of the Gucci company by Maurizio Gucci to Investcorp, and subsequent company owners, in 1993. However, Uberto Gucci (b. 1960), the son of Roberto Gucci, and the grandson of Aldo Gucci, claims that the Gucci family still has the right to use the ancestral Gucci coat-of-arms.

See also 
 Salvatore Ferragamo
 Ermenegildo Zegna
 Louis Vuitton (designer)

References

External links 
 
 

1881 births
1953 deaths
Gucci people
Businesspeople from Florence
Italian expatriates in the United Kingdom
Italian businesspeople in fashion
People from Horsham District
Italian fashion designers